Košická Belá (1297 flimen Bela, 1397 villa Johannis, 1440 Janussffalwa, 1580 Hansdorff, 1650 Bela) is a village and large municipality in Košice-okolie District in the Košice Region of eastern Slovakia.

History
Historically, the first written mention of the village was in 1297 as Villa Johannis when German settlers came here. To the municipality also belonged the villages of Košické Hámre, Malý Folkmar and Ružín, which were flooded when the water reservoir Ružín was filled in 1969.

The name of the village is derived from the stream Belá that flows through it.

Geography
The village lies in the eastern Slovak Ore Mountains at an altitude of 380 metres and covers an area of 39.575 km².
It has a population of 982 people.

Genealogical resources

The records for genealogical research are available at the state archive "Statny Archiv in Levoca, Slovakia"

 Roman Catholic church records (births/marriages/deaths): 1750-1896 (parish A)
 Greek Catholic church records (births/marriages/deaths): 1727-1896 (parish B)
 Lutheran church records (births/marriages/deaths): 1783-1896 (parish B)

See also
 List of municipalities and towns in Slovakia

External links
 
 

http://www.cassovia.sk/obce/kbela/
Surnames of living people in Kosicka Bela

Villages and municipalities in Košice-okolie District
Šariš